The XII Corps of the Ottoman Empire (Turkish: 12 nci Kolordu or On İkinci Kolordu) was one of the corps of the Ottoman Army. It was formed in the early 20th century during Ottoman military reforms.

Formation

Order of battle, 1911 
With further reorganizations of the Ottoman Army, to include the creation of corps level headquarters, by 1911 the XI Corps was headquartered in Musul. The Corps before the First Balkan War in 1911 was structured as such:

XII Corps, Musul
35th Infantry Division, Musul
103rd Infantry Regiment, Revandiz
104th Infantry Regiment, Musul
105th Infantry Regiment, Musul
35th Rifle Battalion, Musul
35th Field Artillery Regiment, Musul
35th Division Band, Musul
36th Infantry Division, Kerkük
106th Infantry Regiment, Kerkük
107th Infantry Regiment, Kerkük
108th Infantry Regiment, Süleymaniye
36th Rifle Battalion, Kerkük
36th Division Band, Kerkük
Units of XII Corps
13th Cavalry Brigade, Kerkük
33rd Cavalry Regiment, Kerkük
34th Cavalry Regiment, Kerkük
35th Cavalry Regiment, Kerkük
Border companies x 8

World War I

Order of battle, August 1914 
In August 1914, the corps was structured as follows:

XII Corps (Mesopotamia)
35th Division, 36th Division

Order of battle, November 1914 
In November 1914, the corps was structured as follows:

XII Corps (Syria)
35th Division, 36th Division

Order of battle, late April 1915 
In late April 1915, the corps was structured as follows:

XII Corps (Syria)
38th Division

Order of battle, late summer 1915, January 1916 
In late summer 1915, January 1916, the corps was structured as follows:

XII Corps (Syria-Palestine)
41st Division, 42nd Division, 46th Division

Order of battle, August 1916, December 1916 
In August 1916, December 1916, the corps was structured as follows:

XII Corps (Syria-Palestine)
41st Division, 42nd Division, 43rd Division, 46th Division

Order of battle, August 1917 
In August 1917, the corps was structured as follows:

XII Corps (Syria-Palestine)
3rd Division, 7th Division, 53rd Division

Order of battle, January 1918 
In January 1918, the corps was structured as follows:

XII Corps (Syria)
3rd Division, 7th Division, 20th Division

Order of battle, June 1918 
In June 1918, the corps was structured as follows:

XII Corps (Palestine)
3rd Division, 7th Division, 20th Division

Order of battle, September 1918 
In September 1918, the corps was structured as follows:

XII Corps (Anatolia)
23rd Division

After Mudros

Order of battle, November 1918 
In November 1918, the corps was structured as follows:

XII Corps (Syria)
23rd Division

Order of battle, January 1919 
In January 1919, the corps was structured as follows:

XII Corps (Anatolia, Konya)
11th Division (Niğde)
12th Infantry Regiment, 33rd Infantry Regiment, 127th Infantry Regiment
41st Division (Karaman)
131st Infantry Regiment, 132nd Infantry Regiment, 139th Infantry Regiment
7th Cavalry Regiment
20th Cavalry Regiment

Sources

Corps of the Ottoman Empire
Military units and formations of the Ottoman Empire in World War I